Ashraf Dali (Ashraf Aboul-Yazid) is an Egyptian poet, novelist and journalist. He was born in Banha (also spelt Benha), Egypt on March 13, 1963. He is the Acting President of the AJA (Asia Journalist Association). Ashraf Dali won the Manhae Prize in Literature 2014. Since 1989, when his first book of poetry was published, Ashraf Aboul-Yazid (Ashraf Dali) has been keen to introduce himself as a man of words. He won the Arab Journalism Award in Culture, in 2015, given by Dubai Press Club, UAE, for his work published in Al-Arabi magazine, The Art of Miniature in Literature, History and Myth.

Some of his literary works are translated into Spanish, Korean, Turkish, English and Persian. Selected poems were also translated into Russian, and Italian. He has published his travels to more than 33 countries in Al-Arabi magazine, and other cultural periodicals.

Dali has participated in cultural international conferences held in Egypt, Spain, Italy, Germany, Russia, Costa Rica, Syria, Yemen, UAE, Kuwait, Morocco, Saudi Arabia, Oman and the Republic of Korea.

He introduced some figures of literature from South Korea, Russia and India to Arab readers, and his most recently translations were two volumes of Korean poetry; 'One Thousand & One Lives, An Anthology of Selected Poems' by the Korean Poet Ko Un),  and 'Qeddison Youhalleqo Baaidan (The Far-off Saint), Translated Poems' by the Korean Poet Cho Oh-hyun. Since March 2009, he has been writing weekly adventures to introduce the Asian Silk Road cities and civilizations to Arab children.

Works

Books published in Arabic

Poetry
Washwashat Al Bahr, (The Whisper of the Sea), Poetry, Cairo, 1989.
Al Asdaf, (The Shells), Poetry, Cairo, 1996.
Zakirat Al Samt, (The Memory of Silence), Poetry, Beirut, 2000.
Fawqa Sirat Al Mawt, (On the Passage of Death), Poetry, Cairo, 2001.
Zakirat Al Farashat, (The Memory of Butterflies), Poetry, Cairo, 2005.

Novels
Shamawes, (Novel), Dar Al-Ain, Cairo, 2008
Hadiqa Khalfeyya (A Backyard Garden), (Novel), Maktabat Al-Mashareq, Cairo, 2011 
(31), (Novel),Maktabat Al-Mashareq,Cairo, 2011

Criticism and biographies
Sirat Al Lawn, (the Story of Color), Art Criticism, Cairo, 2003.
Muzakkrat Musafer, The Memories of a Traveler, Biography on Al-Sheikh Mustafa Abdul Razik travels to France, Abu Dhabi, UAE, 2004. 
Al Shiekh Mustafa AbdulRaziq Musaferan wa Muqiman,( (Al Azhar Sheikh Travels and Memories at home ), Travels, Cairo, 2006.
The Story of an Artist Who Lived 5000 Years, History of Art for Children, Cairo 2006. 
The Arab World Kids, Poems for Children, Kuwait, 2006. 
Sirat Musafer (A Traveler tale), Travels, Cairo, 2008
Abath al Shabab (The Joy of the Youth), Bayrem Al-Tunsi papers in Tunisia, Alexandria Bibliotheca, 2008
The Arab Travelers (Rahhalatol Arab), for children, Kuwait, 2009 
The Sea Post Fish Poetic story for Children, Kuwait, 2011.
Shurali (The Carpenter and the Evil of the Forest), a folk tale by the Tatar poet Abdullah Tukay, for Children, Kuwait, 2011
The Sheep and the Goat, a folk tale by the Tatar poet Abdullah Tukay, for Children, Kuwait, 2013
Non Anniswa, Nahrol-Fan, Feminine N, River of Art, Biography, Dar Al-Hilal, Cairo 2013 
The Silk Road (A Cultural Pictorial Encyclopedia), Alexandria Bibliotheca, 2013
Ariver on Travel, travels, Al-Arabi books, Kuwait, 2015

Translations
Korean Folk Tales, for Children, Al-Arabi Books, Kuwait, 2008
I and Surrealism, Salvador Dalí,(Biography),  Dubai Thaqafeyya magazine, UAE, 2010
One Thousand & One Lives, An Anthology of Selected Poems Written by the Korean Poet Ko Un),  Dubai Thaqafeyya magazine, UAE, 2012
Qeddison Youhalleqo Baaidan (The Far-off Saint), Translated Poems Written by the Korean Poet Cho O-hyun, Bait-Alghasham,  Muscat, Oman, 2013

Books published in other languages 
Shamawes, (Novel), (Korean), Seoul, South Korea, 2008
Una calle en el Cairo, (A street in Cairo), Poetry, translated by Nadia Gamaleddin, (Spanish), Costa Rica, 2010.
Anthology, Poetry, (Turkish), translated ny Metin Fendcgi, Istanbul, Turkey, 2012.
The Memory of Silence, Poetry, (English), Cairo, 2013
The memory of Butterflies, Poetry, translated by Nesrin Shakibi Mumtaz,(Persian), Dar Afraz, Tehran, 2013

Work career posts: 
	The AsiaN, Arabic version, Editor-in-chief, since 2012. 
	Al Arabi magazine, Senior Editor, Kuwait, since 2002. 
	Reuters, cultural editor, Cairo, 2001 – 2002. 
	Adab wa Naqd (Literature & Criticism) magazine, editor and art director, Cairo, 2001 – 2002 
	Nizwa magazine, editor and art director,  Oman, 1998 - 2001   
	Arabian Advertising Agency,  editor and art director,  Oman, 1992 – 1998 
	Al Manar Magazine, editor and translator, Cairo, 1990 – 1991.
       In his TV program "The Other", he has interviews with more than 90 literary and artistic figures from almost 50 non-Arab countries to Arab viewers, telecasted in Kuwaiti TV channels, 2010-2012

References

Korean KBS Radio announces Ashraf Aboul-Yazid winner of Manhae Prize 2014 http://world.kbs.co.kr/arabic/program/program_fridaynews_detail.htm?no=338 
Interview with Ashraf Aboul-Yazid, An-Nahar daily newspaper, Kuwait http://www.annaharkw.com/annahar/Article.aspx?id=474801&date=03082014
A Backyard Garden, Reviewed by : Dr. Salah Fadl, Al-Ahram daily Newspaper http://www.ahram.org.eg/archive/849/2012/03/26/10/139399.aspx
Short biography documentary, directed by Fatima Al-Zahraa Hassan, August 2014 on Ashraf Aboul-Yazid https://www.youtube.com/watch?v=4zZLBPh-clw
Ashraf Aboul-Yazid, interviewed on the Egyptian TV, Satellite Channel 2, on the River Nile in Cairo, talking on being awarded Manhae Prize in Literature, his books, and Asia, September 2014. https://www.youtube.com/watch?v=Jaub40dGOwQ
Bayram al-Tunsi book 
 https://web.archive.org/web/20141214010552/http://classic.aawsat.com/details.asp?section=19&article=501987&issueno=10999#.VE5uYGIgGSM
One Thousand & One Lives 
 http://www.startimes.com/f.aspx?t=31177695
 http://www.alittihad.ae/details.php?id=80644&y=2012
Novel: 31
 
Al-Arabi magazine conference 2010, Paper on the TV programs content for children
 https://web.archive.org/web/20111228135457/http://www.jehat.com/Jehaat/ar/AljehaAhkhamesa/8-9-10-a.htm
Salvador Dalí book review
 http://www.alwatan.com.sa/Culture/News_Detail.aspx?ArticleID=20813&CategoryID=7
 Пресс-центр Ассамблеи народов Евразии: V открытый ЕВРАЗИЙСКИЙ литературный фестиваль «ЛИФФТ-2021»: итоги

External links

http://ar.theasian.asia
http://www.ajanews.asia

Living people
1963 births
People from Benha
20th-century Egyptian poets
Egyptian novelists
Egyptian journalists
21st-century Egyptian poets
Egyptian male poets
20th-century male writers
21st-century male writers